Pekin Township is located in Tazewell County, Illinois. As of the 2010 census, its population was 29,807 and it contained 13,321 housing units.

Geography

Demographics

References

External links
 US Census
 Illinois State Archives

Peoria metropolitan area, Illinois
Townships in Illinois
Townships in Tazewell County, Illinois